Miss Europe 1974 was the 37th edition of the Miss Europe pageant and the 26th edition under the Mondial Events Organization. It was held in Vienna, Austria on 29 May 1974. Maria Isabel "Maribel" Lorenzo Saavedra of Spain, was crowned Miss Europe 1974 by outgoing titleholder Anna "Anke" Maria Groot of Holland. The 1975 contest was originally scheduled to take place in Beirut, Lebanon but was cancelled due to the Lebanese Civil War. The contest returned in 1976.

Results

Placements

Special awards

Contestants 

 - Margit Schwarzer
 - Anne-Marie Sophie Sikorski
 - Joanna (Ιrini-Ioanna) Melanidou
 - Kathleen Ann Celeste Anders
 - Riitta Johanna Raunio
 - Edna Tepava
 - Monja Bageritz
 Greece - Katerina Papadimitriou (real name: Katerina Bakalli)
 - Gerarda "Gemma" Sophia Balm
 - Yvonne Costelloe
 - Tanina di Grado
 - Giselle Anita Nicole Azzeri
 - Jane Attard
 - Solveig Boberg
 - Ana Paula da Silva Freitas
 - Maria Isabel "Maribel" Lorenzo Saavedra
 - UNKNOWN
 - UNKNOWN
 - Sibel Kamman

Notes

Withdrawals

Returns

"Comité Officiel et International Miss Europe" 1974 Competition

From 1951 to 2002 there was a rival Miss Europe competition organized by the "Comité Officiel et International Miss Europe". This was founded in 1950 by Jean Raibaut in Paris, the headquarters later moved to Marseille. The winners wore different titles like Miss Europe, Miss Europa or Miss Europe International.

This year, the contest took place at the Oasis Maspalomas Hotel in Maspalomas, Las Palmas, Canary Islands, Spain on 26 April 1974. There 19 contestants all representing different countries and regions of Europe. At the end, Wenche Steen of Norway was crowned as Miss Europa 1974. She succeeded predecessor Diana Scapolan of Italy.

Placements

Special awards

Miss Tourism Europe

Contestants

 - Marie Chantal de Marque
 - Marie Paule Achard
 - Lone Christensen
 - UNKNOWN
 - Evelyne Quittard
 - Christel Kalkenhauser
 Greece - Lia Vasiliou
 - Yvonne Jansen
 - UNKNOWN
 - Lucía Luisa Simonelli
 - Marinella Taboni
 - Viviane Rauch
 - Dany Coutelier
 - Wenche Steen
 - Izabella Lipka
 - Maria del Rocío Martín Madrigal
 - Helene Yvonne Apelgren
 - Daniele Farquet
 - Sibel Kamman

Notes

Withdrawals

 Mediterranean

Returns

Debuts

"Comité Officiel et International Miss Europe" 1975 Competition

In 1975, the contest was held again and it took place at the Holiday Inn Hotel in Monaco in May 1975. There 19 contestants all representing different countries and regions of Europe. At the end, Vivianne Van der Cauter of Belgium was crowned as Miss Europa 1975. She succeeded predecessor Wenche Steen of Norway.

Placements

Contestants

 - Rosalina Mestres
 - Vivianne Van der Cauter
 - UNKNOWN
Elegance (Miss Elegance) - UNKNOWN
 - UNKNOWN
 - Dany Voissin-Renucci
 - UNKNOWN
 - Marga Scheide
 - UNKNOWN
 - UNKNOWN
 Mediterranean - UNKNOWN
 - Kate Rasmussen
 - UNKNOWN
 - UNKNOWN
 - Carmen García
 - UNKNOWN
 - UNKNOWN
 - UNKNOWN
 - UNKNOWN

Notes

Withdrawals

 Greece

Returns
 Mediterranean

Debuts

Elegance (Miss Elegance)

References

External links 
 

Miss Europe
1974 beauty pageants
1975 beauty pageants
1974 in Austria
1974 in Spain
1975 in Monaco